Leopold Lichtenberg (November 22, 1861 – May 16, 1935) was an American violinist.

Biography
Lichtenberg was born in San Francisco, California to Jewish parents. Lichtenberg studied under Beaujardin, and made his first appearance in concert when eight years of age. In his twelfth year, he was asked by Henryk Wieniawski, then on a visit to California, to become his pupil. He accompanied Wieniawski on a tour through America. Some time afterward he spent six months in Paris under Lambert, and then rejoined Wieniawski at Brussels Conservatory, where he studied unremittingly for three years. After winning a prize at a national competition held in Belgium, he made a successful tour through the Netherlands.

Upon his return to America he played with Theodore Thomas' orchestra in New York City, and gave a number of recitals in other cities. After spending three years more in Europe, Lichtenberg gave another series of concerts in America, after which he settled for some time in Boston, Massachusetts, as a member of the Boston Symphony Orchestra. He next went to New York City to take charge of the department of violin at the National Conservatory. His fine technique and beautiful tone entitled him to high rank among violinists.

With pianist Adèle Margulies and cellist Leo Schulz, he formed the Margulies Trio, which became one of the foremost chamber music organizations of the United States. Lichtenberg died in Brooklyn, New York City, in 1935.

References

 Baker, Biographical Dictionary of Musicians

Further reading
 Claghorn, Charles Eugene. Biographical dictionary of American music, Parker Pub. Co., 1974.
 Roth, Henry. Great violinists in performance. Critical evaluations of over 100 Twentieth-Century virtuosi, Panjamdrum Books, 1987.

External links
 

Jewish American musicians
People from San Francisco
American violinists
American male violinists
1861 births
1935 deaths